Balmacara Square is a small village, close to Balmacara, in Lochlash, Scottish Highlands and is in the council area of Highland.

In 1946, the village was bequeathed to the National Trust for Scotland. It recently underwent extensive renovation which is still continuing.

References

Populated places in Lochalsh